The Theological College of Lanka (TCL) is a college that was inaugurated in 1963 by the Anglican Church, the Methodist Church and the Baptist Church in Sri Lanka. Later the Presbyterian Church (Presbytery of Lanka) joined the federation, to educate the new clergy (ministers) and laity in the environment and context of Sri Lanka and their own languages, Sinhala and Tamil. Rev. Basil Jackson, a British Methodist Missionary, became the founding Principal of the college in 1963. (Prior to the foundation of TCL, Jackson served as the founding director of the Ecumenical Institute for Study and Dialogue in Colombo). It is believed that language is the vehicle of culture and when Christians begin to think, speak, preach, pray and write in their own languages, they soon become familiar with their cultural values and begin to appreciate them in the practice of their Christian faith. This new step was foreseen by all the churches as an attempt to produce indigenous theology by people who are being educated in Sri Lanka.

Before this venture, the ministers of Sri Lankan (then Ceylon) Protestant traditions have been educated mainly in India (United Theological College, Bishop's College, Serampore College, Kolkotta  etc.) or elsewhere for the pastoral ministry.

TCL is situated in Plimatalawa village, Kandy district, about 100 km away from Colombo.

The Theological College of Lanka is affiliated to the Senate of Serampore College (University) of India and accredited by the Association of the Theological Education in South East Asia (ATESEA). Over 90% of the active clergy in the constituent churches in Sri Lanka today have received their theological and pastoral education at the TCL.

The TCL is the only accredited ecumenical theological college among the Protestant churches of Sri Lanka, which not only maintains its ecumenical foundation, but also brings together the Sinhala and Tamil students who are both men and women in a fellowship both at work and at leisure. This is an integral aspect of the personal and spiritual formation of the future ministers of a country which is torn apart by ethnic divisions.

Contributing to the theological-praxical debate, the college publishes a biannual journal – Sri Lanka Journal  of Theological Reflection (SLJTR) which was commenced in July 2005.

Towards Sri Lankan Identity 

After independence from Britain in 1948, the outward occurrences in Sri Lanka, especially the decreasing missionary influence and the independent parliamentary system, affected the Christian churches in many ways. Christians became aware of their self-identity and the selfhood of the church.

There was a small group of Christians who had foreseen the need to think and act as in new ways after independence. Among them was the Reverend Lakdasa de Mel whose process of indigenisation launched at Baddhegama in the 1920s was an important step. His efforts eventually created what is now called the Ceylon Liturgy, using Sinhala folk music derived from sources such as the paddy farmers, cartmen and boatmen in rural areas of Sri Lanka. Pioneering activities such as this became valuable when the British left the Island in 1948. People who had become Christians through the work of missionaries were forced to rethink their identity in the emerging post-colonial context.

Significant cultural and social changes did not begin to take place until the late 1950s, and especially after the 1956 general election. The coalition government headed by the newly formed Sri Lanka Freedom Party set out to establish a new cultural identity. The English language was displaced by the use of Sinhala and Tamil for all official business as well as in education. The Church equally accepted the importance of local languages but saw its own future looking very bleak when the government decided to take over management of the school network.

In 1963 three of the Protestant churches in Sri Lanka, namely Anglican, Methodist and Baptist decided to form a theological college for the training of future ministers. After much discussion and consideration the founders of this college opted for the use of local languages and a localised cultural emphasis. Later, the Presbyterian Church in Sri Lanka joined with the other churches to formulate the training of their ministers. When the Theological College was founded in Lanka in 1963 it was almost unthinkable that theology should be taught in local languages, namely Sinhala and Tamil.

Sri Lankan Christian Theology 
Nationalism became very prominent in Sri Lanka after independence. This situation forced Christians to inculturise Christianity. The task of inculturising Christianity became a difficult exercise, due to the Western culture and theology which prevailed among Christians. They found it difficult to accept and think along with their Hindu, Buddhist and Muslim friends. If there had been no English influence, this process would have commenced long before, but now it came too late and was too little. The inculturisation process was not able to baptize the Sri Lankan culture and make a significant impact upon societies influenced by Buddhism, Hinduism and Islam. Nevertheless, many attempts were made to inculturise Christianity in a Sri Lankan context. This process proceeded parallelly, in both Sinhala and Tamil cultures. The inculturisation process emphasised by many church leaders and emerging Asian Christian theologies influenced the churches in Sri Lanka very much. The churches in Sri Lanka felt that the Western influence in architecture, music and worship forms merely imitated the West. Therefore, people desired to experience the gospel in a truly Sri Lankan context, thereby expressing their faith and worship of God by using their own language, symbols, songs, dances and other social and cultural idioms.

Doing Christian Theology in the Sri Lankan culture means, to be able to understand God in culture as expressed in life situations. God is a God of history and one should be able to understand God in the Sri Lankan history. Therefore, in order to produce an indigenous theology, it is essential to understand the meaning of Sinhala and Tamil cultures in Sri Lanka.

Contributing to the theological and praxical debates, college publishes a journal:Sri Lanka Journal of Theological Reflection.

Nature and Structure of the Theological College of Lanka 
Lectures at the Theological College are held in Sinhala, Tamil and English. Sinhala and Tamil students are required to write in their own languages. Tamil students study Practical Sinhala and Sinhala students study practical Tamil, giving all students a practical knowledge of each other's language.

Apart from classroom work, field education is taken seriously as an integral part of the students' tuition. The field education programme is divided into three main areas – weekend field education; long-vacation field placement and a research-and-an-extended essay on a subject chosen by the student.

The chapel is decorated with Sri Lankan woodcarvings. The congregation remove their footwear and sit on the floor. Indigenous musical instruments such as tabla, violin and sitar mainly accompany worship. Guitars are used where appropriate, without displacing the indigenous atmosphere of worship.

Sinhala students study Buddhism under a scholarly monk while Tamil students study Hinduism from an experienced tutor.

The Theological College of Pilimatalawa has effectively shown that Sinhala and Tamil students can study together in the same classes in their own languages. It is important to note that the importance of English is as a link language and not as the language of the elite.

When Sinhala lecturers teach in Sinhala and English, Tamil students depend on their knowledge of English and other students to understand what is being taught. Similarly, when Tamil lecturers each in Tamil and English, Tamil students depend on their knowledge of English and other students.

Sinhala and Tamil lecturers always try to give a summary in another language to make students from other ethnic groups feel comfortable. Although this way of teaching is not easy it has brought Sinhala and Tamil students together without abandoning their mother tongue.

Located in a predominately Buddhist village, the college has served Sri Lankan society for forty years, training Christian ministers who will work in the community with a sound understanding of Sri Lankan realities and make bridges between various socio-cultural and religious groups.

The theologising process has helped the students to identify the needs, aspirations and anxieties of the people in a given area and to respond theologically, to know the involvement of the churches and their relationship with one another and with other faiths, in an attempt to discern the work of God through people of other faiths, ideologies and other organisations, to learn from the experiences of different individuals and organisations, already involved in the community and to be challenged for a creative and a fruitful contextual ministry in the areas, where they will be placed in the future.

Historical Survey of the Theological College of Lanka 

A Consultation committee appointed by the Protestant churches in Sri Lanka to submit a report for discussion. The committee reported back on 17 September 1952 that it was time to re-study the problems and progress of Sri Lankan theological education. The first notice about ‘a conversation of the Theological Training in Ceylon’ was sent out by Rev. Basil Jackson on 1 June 1956. The first, one day consultation on theological training was held on 12 July 1956 at the Study Centre. Two speakers, Rev Cyril Abenayake from the Anglican Church and Rev Tom Garret from the Tamil Nadu Theological Seminary presented the issues and guided the church representatives to look at the theological education seriously in Sri Lanka for the churches in Sri Lanka. This consultation appointed a constitution committee  to draft a possible cooperation document between participating churches.  The consultation committee submitted their report to the participating churches on 17 September 1958. Another four member committee appointed by the churches,  chaired by Rev. R. C. Cooling was presented to the participating churches in February 1957. This report appealed to the churches to collaborate among themselves, and suggested for the sake of presenting the gospel for the people of Ceylon in the language and idiom of the Swabasha speaking people of the country.

This report and all the discussions on this topic took place previously made the Churches in Sri Lanka felt that the present Western influence in architecture, music and forms of worship merely imitates the West. Therefore, people should experience the Gospel in a truly Sri Lankan context, thereby expressing their faith and worship of God by using their own language, symbols, songs, dances and other social and cultural patterns.

In response to the need for an ‘educated clergy,’ and the social status, theological educational institution in Sri Lanka became the need of the day. The first meeting of the Board of Governors of the Theological College of Lanka was held on 15 December 1961 at the Methodist Headquarters in Colombo to look at a suitable venue. The ‘Ference’, was identified.  The second meeting held on 3 January 1962 decided to request the Methodist Church in Ceylon to release the property on lease.

On 12 September 1962, it was decided to represent the Board of the Theological College of Lanka at the next Senate meeting of the Senate of Serampore College.

On 28 November 1962 it was decided to nominate Canon de Mel to represent the college.

On 9 February 1963, Cannon de Mel reported back, "Senate passed a resolution that the Principal of TCL should apply for affiliation."

26 June 1964 BOG minutes say that a team from the Senate of Serampore College visited the college on 9 and 10 April 1964. On 25 June 1964, the college received a telegram informing "affiliation granted letter following." From this point onwards several decisions were made based on suggestions and papers to make the theological education in Sri Lanka contextually routed to the country.

The Ceylon Daily Mirror, 13 January 1962 reported that a ‘Swabasha Theological College’ will be inaugurated in July 1963. The Ceylon Daily Mirror, 11 July 1963 reported about the inauguration of the Theological College of Lanka on 10 July 1964.

The Serampore granted permission for the first batch of students enrolled in 1963 to register for the Licentiate in Theology (L.Th) certificate.  The L.Th programme continued until the Senate delegation visited the college from 3 and 4 March 1970 and upgraded the college to B.Th.

A working paper presented by the Rev. C. D. E. Premawardhana, titled ‘The Future Structure and Scope of the Theological College of Lanka"  initiated a single integrated training for Sinhala and Tamil students at the college. This move was made with the hope that the Jaffna Diocese of the CSI would join the federation of the college. However, Dr D. T. Niles officially informed that the "Bishop of the CSI did not seem interested in the Tamil stream at the TCL."

Based on a paper presented by the Rev C. D. E. Premawardena dated 31 October 1968, the BOG  decided to initiate three units at the college. 1) The Department of Lay Training 2) The Department of Christian education to train teachers of Christianity 3) The Institute of Buddhist Studies. Study of Theravada Buddhism in order to find meaningful Asian Theology.

The Department of Lay Training launched a correspondence course, ‘The Christian Faith’ in January 1972 initiated by the Rev Georg E. Good.

The Year 1976 has been a mile stone in the life of the college. Mr. D. S. A. Hapuarchchige, the English-Sinhala translator of the college translated six English books in Sinhala in the fields of the Old Testament, New Testament and Christian education and were published.

The Department of Lay Training became the Lay Institute  and function under the directorship of Rev Yohan Devananda. "How do we Live in the Gospel Today" has been the general theme of the Lay Institute.

It was felt that the whole of the Theological College of Lanka experience needs to be an intentional learning opportunity, not just the classroom hours. Students should be discouraged from being consumers, picking and choosing what they believe they will need and ignoring elements that are more demanding or less appealing. Looking back many former students have confessed that they wished they had taken more notice of this or that subject because they were unaware at the time of how valuable it would subsequently prove. This has made the college to seriously look at the library of the college and a permanent librarian Mrs Rose Sinnathamby was appointed on 1 December 1978.

The college joined the Association of the Theological Colleges in South East Asia (ATESEA) in 1978.

Serampore College commenced ‘Diploma in Christian Studies’ and ‘Bachelor of Christian Studies’ programmes.

Church History Documentation Centre to preserve the historical stories of the churches in Sri Lanka, initiated by Dr Klaus Koschorke was launched in 1993  and later moved to a spacious room at the newly built library at the college.

The first TCL journal ‘Voice of the Street’ was launched in 2003.

Sri Lanka Journal of Theological Reflection (SLJTR) was launched in 2005 as a biannual publication of the Theological College of Lanka (TCL). "The journal is to enfold the thoughts, ideas and theology kindled by the people living in, migrated from or closely connected with the island called Sri Lanka. It was an attempt to provide a forum to foster theological thinking in Sri Lanka. SLJTR is the story of a people’s dynamic corporative response to the challenge of the Gospel of Christ and of life in the environment of Sri Lanka. We have discovered that Sri Lankan theology and Church have a history of their own."

The intentionality of the learning contract we have with students should relate to much more than the acquisition of academic knowledge of an individual. The whole learning process should go with the discipleship and character of the family as well. Spouses of the married students who are brilliant in vocational skills requested a systematic training programme during their stay as a family in the college. They wanted to be assets in future church leadership. As a response a two-year the Spouses Class Certificate programme launched in 2005.

Academic instruction needs to go along with skill development and personal growth. Any one dimension without the others is a distorted education that leads to malformed graduates ill-equipped to cope with the demands that will be placed on them. Theological education inevitably is trying to satisfy a number of different audiences – the academy, the church, the world, the laity and the student him or herself. As a response to the tsunami disaster in December 2004, the college launched two programmes for the internal students and laity in 2006. 1) Diploma in Counselling and Group Work Skills (Dip CGWS) 2) Diploma in Special Education on Disability (Dip SED).

After the civil war ended in 2009, TCL launched a programme in 2010 the " making safe spaces to share our stories" programme for the purpose of national reconciliation and healing in the country and promoting multiculturalism,interfaith and inter ethnic relationships.

The Theological college of Lanka entered partnership with the Queen's Foundation, UK in 2011

During the thanksgiving service and memorial lecture for the late former Principal Rev and Mrs. Soma Perera which was held on 1st September 2012 at the TCL chapel, a new initiative for work of Peace Studies, Rev Soma Perera Center for Peace and Reconciliation Studies was inaugurated. TCL also initiated a Rev. Soma Perera Peace Award to be given to a significant national contributor to Peace and Justice in Sri Lanka.

In  July 2013 The Theological College of Lanka celebrated her Golden Jubilee. The theme of the Golden Jubilee became "God of Life Reconcile us" -calling all people of God to be messengers of God's peace and justice in the world, in the context of given need for peace and reconciliation resulting from the prolonged ethnic conflict in Sri Lanka . Reverend Dr. Dietrich Werner was the Chief Guest and came as the official representative of the World Council of Churches (WCC) at this solemn and significant moment. WCC's theological education fund offered one of the first grants for the foundation of the college in earnest view of formation of a new generation of ministers and laity, theologians and students for the unity of the church, nation building and peacemaking in a new nation.

October 2013 a TCL team took part, presented a drama directed by Sudesh De Silva, a lay artist,  in the WCC General Assembly in Busan Korea: the theme was God of Life lead us to justice and peace.

In 2020 January TCL hosted a seminar on Christian Witness in a pluralistic context in partnership with Emory University's World Methodist Evangelism Institute in Atlanta, Georgia, USA.

References

Bibliography
Somaratne G.P.V (ed) Splendor of Nandana Uyana:a History of the Theological College of Lanka,2014.

External links 
 Speech given by M.M.Thomas on TCL's 30th anniversary

Seminaries and theological colleges in Sri Lanka
Colleges in Sri Lanka
Educational institutions established in 1963
Education in Central Province, Sri Lanka
1963 establishments in Ceylon